Susan Alice Nolan is a clinical psychologist and psychology educator who studies critical thinking in the classroom, assessment in higher education, mental health, and gender disparities in STEM fields. Nolan is a professor of psychology at Seton Hall University.

Nolan was President of the Society for the Teaching of Psychology in 2021, and President of the Eastern Psychological Association from 2014-2015.

She received the Fukuhara Award for Advanced International Research and Service from the International Council of Psychologists in 2020.

Biography 
Nolan began her college years at College of the Holy Cross where she earned her A.B. in. 1990. After that, she went to Northwestern University where in 1996, where she earned her Ph.D. in Clinical Psychology under the supervision of Ian Gotlib and Susan Mineka.  Nolan then completed a Clinical Internship at Vanderbilt University through the Nashville Department of Veteran Affairs.

Nolan joined the faculty of Seton Hall University and teaches various courses including Abnormal Psychology, International Psychology, and Statistics. She has co-authored statistics and introductory psychology textbooks, and a volume on applications of psychological science.

Nolan a Fellow of the American Psychological Association and previously served as the United Nations representative for the American Psychological Association. Nolan has worked abroad through the U.S. Fulbright Scholar program.

Research 
Nolan's clinical research has linked neuroticism and rumination with an increased risk of depression. One of her studies examined the effects of neuroticism and ruminative response style on changes in symptoms of depression over an 8 to 10 week period. Nolan found that neuroticism and ruminative response style predicted changes in symptoms of depression more strongly in individuals who initially had a severe case of depression as compared to those with lower initial levels of depression.

Books 

 Hockenbury, S. E. & Nolan, S. A. (2019). Discovering psychology. Worth.
 Landrum, R. E., Gurung, R. A., Nolan, S. A., McCarthy, M. A., & Dunn, D. S. (2022). Everyday applications of psychological science: Hacks to happiness and health. Routledge.
 Nolan, S. A., & Heinzen, T. (2011). Statistics for the behavioral sciences. Macmillan.
 Nolan, S. A., & Heinzen, T. (2010). Essentials of statistics for the behavioral sciences. Macmillan.

Representative publications 

 Haynes-Mendez, K. D., Nolan, S. A., Littleford, L. N., & Woolf, L. M. (2022). Diversity, equity, inclusion, and internationalization: Past, present, and future of STP. Teaching of Psychology, 00986283221126424.
 Mannion, K. H., & Nolan, S. A. (2020). The effect of smartphones on anxiety: An attachment issue or fear of missing out? Cogent Psychology, 7(1), 1869378.
 Morgan-Consoli, M. L., Inman, A. G., Bullock, M., & Nolan, S. A. (2018). Framework for competencies for US psychologists engaging internationally. International Perspectives in Psychology: Research, Practice, Consultation, 7(3), 174–188.
 Nolan, S. A., Buckner, J. P., Marzabadi, C. H., & Kuck, V. J. (2008). Training and mentoring of chemists: A study of gender disparity. Sex Roles, 58(3), 235-250.
 Nolan, S. A., Flynn, C., & Garber, J. (2003). Prospective relations between rejection and depression in young adolescents. Journal of Personality and Social Psychology, 85(4), 745–755.
 Nolan, S. A., Roberts, J. E., & Gotlib, I. H. (1998). Neuroticism and ruminative response style as predictors of change in depressive symptomatology. Cognitive Therapy and Research, 22(5), 445–455.

References

External links 
Faculty profile at Seton Hall University

Living people
American women psychologists
Seton Hall University faculty
Northwestern University alumni
College of the Holy Cross alumni
Year of birth missing (living people)
American clinical psychologists